Pedro Kamata (born 6 September 1981) is a Congolese former professional footballer who played as a winger. Born in Angola, he made one appearance for the DR Congo national team.

Club career
Kamata was born in Luanda, Angola. He started his career at Auxerre. He then joined FC Groningen in the summer of 2002, only to return to Ligue 2 in order to join Clermont Foot in January 2003. He then kept playing in Ligue 2 until he was signed by Legnano of Serie C2 in 2005. He helped the club to win promotion to Serie C1 in the summer of 2007. During the 2007–08 Serie C1 season, he was signed by Bari of Serie B, and went on to make his debut at Serie A level in 2009.

In 2010, he was sold to A.C. Siena in co-ownership deal for €500,000. Siena also signed Filippo Carobbio for €500,000. The deals was part of Abdelkader Ghezzal's transfer to Bari.

In June 2011 Siena and Bari made a pure player swap, which Carobbio, Kamata and Nicola Belmonte joined Siena outright, and Ghezzal joined Bari outright.

In August 2011 he mutually terminated the contract with Siena. He joined AS Yzeure in September 2011

International career
In 2001, he played his first and unique game for the France national under-20 team  in a friendly match against Finland.

In 2004, he was named in DR Congo squad for 2006 FIFA World Cup qualification. But at that time he was too old to switch nationality. Instead, Makiadi Kamata played his first and last match for DR Congo, which there is unknown connection with the two "Kamata".

In 2006, he was named by Angola coach Luís Gonçalves for the 2006 Africa Cup of Nations held in Egypt, but was unable to obtain the necessary clearance from FIFA for a switch in national allegiance.

However, in 2010, he was able to play for DR Congo in a friendly match against Saudi Arabia. It is because FIFA abolished the age limit of age 21 for nationality switch for multi-nationality holders in 2009.

References

External links

gazzetta.it 

1981 births
Living people
Footballers from Luanda
Democratic Republic of the Congo footballers
Democratic Republic of the Congo international footballers
French footballers
France youth international footballers
Angolan footballers
Angolan emigrants to France
Angolan people of Democratic Republic of the Congo descent
French sportspeople of Democratic Republic of the Congo descent
French sportspeople of Angolan descent
Citizens of the Democratic Republic of the Congo through descent
Association football midfielders
Eredivisie players
Serie A players
Serie B players
AJ Auxerre players
FC Groningen players
Clermont Foot players
LB Châteauroux players
A.C. Legnano players
S.S.C. Bari players
A.C.N. Siena 1904 players
Moulins Yzeure Foot players
AS Moulins players
Democratic Republic of the Congo expatriate footballers
French expatriate footballers
Angolan expatriate footballers
Democratic Republic of the Congo expatriate sportspeople in Italy
Expatriate footballers in Italy
Democratic Republic of the Congo expatriate sportspeople in the Netherlands
Expatriate footballers in the Netherlands
Black French sportspeople